Andrew Bathgate Clarke (5 February 1868 – 1 February 1940) was a British Labour Party politician who served as the member of parliament (MP) for Midlothian and Peebles Northern for two short periods in the 1920s.

He first contested the seat at 1922 general election, and won it in 1923, with a 9.6% majority over the sitting Conservative Party MP Sir George Hutchison. At the 1924 general election, Hutchison retook the seat, but died in office in December 1928.  Clarke won the seat back at the resulting by-election in January 1929, but only held it for 121 days until the general election in May 1929.  He unsuccessfully contested the seat one more time, at the 1931 election.

References

External links 

Members of the Parliament of the United Kingdom for Scottish constituencies
1868 births
1940 deaths
Scottish Labour MPs
UK MPs 1923–1924
UK MPs 1924–1929